WHKY may refer to:

WHKY (AM), a radio station (1290 AM) licensed to Hickory, North Carolina, United States
 WHKY-FM, a radio station (102.9 FM) licensed to Hickory, North Carolina, United States, now called WLKO
WHKY-TV, a television station (channel 14, virtual 14) licensed to Hickory, North Carolina, United States